Kate Bolick (born 1972) is the author of New York Times bestseller Spinster: Making a Life of One's Own. She is also a contributing editor for The Atlantic, and host of "Touchstones at The Mount," an annual literary interview series at Edith Wharton’s country estate in the Berkshires.

Bolick attended Colby College and New York University.

Career
Kate Bolick is most well known as the author of New York Times bestseller Spinster: Making a Life of One's Own. In addition to her work with The Atlantic, Bolick contributes writing to Elle, Cosmopolitan, Vogue, The New York Times, and The Wall Street Journal, among other publications. Previously, Bolick was the executive editor of Domino, as well as a columnist for The Boston Globe's Ideas Section.

Bolick's appearances include The Today Show, CBS Sunday Morning, CNN, Fox News, MSNBC, and NPR programs around the country.

Spinster: Making a Life of One's Own
In her 2015 New York Times Bestselling book, Bolick asks and answers a question she posed in a 2011 cover story for The Atlantic: "How does a woman move through life alone?" Heather Havrilesky, writing in The New York Times, gave the book a positive review, saying that "what Spinster actually offers is an idiosyncratic journey through Bolick's decades-long exploration of how to live independently, with cues from an assortment of nontraditional women."

References

American women journalists
Writers from Brooklyn
Living people
21st-century American memoirists
American women memoirists
21st-century American women writers
Journalists from New York City
1972 births
Colby College alumni
New York University alumni